Robert Earl Blair (August 6, 1930 – March 19, 2001), was an American gospel musician and leader of The Fantastic Violinaires originating from Detroit, Michigan from 1965 until his death. He started his music career, in 1965, with the release of Stand by Me by Checker Records. His album, The Pink Tornado, was released in 1988 by Atlanta International Records, and this was his breakthrough release upon the Billboard magazine Gospel Albums chart. He released 30 albums over the course of his career.

Early life
Blair was born on August 6, 1930, as Robert Earl Blair.

Music career
His music recording career commenced in 1965, with the album, Stand by Me, and it was released by Checker Records. He released an album in 1988 with Atlanta International Records, The Pink Tornado, and it was his breakthrough release upon the Billboard magazine Gospel Albums chart at No. 34. His music career ended at his death in 2001, and by that time he released 30 albums with several labels.

Personal life
Blair died on March 19, 2001, of a heart attack.

Discography

References

External links
 Opal Nations article

1930 births
2001 deaths
African-American  male songwriters
African-American Christians
Musicians from Detroit
Songwriters from Michigan
20th-century African-American male singers